No. 187 Squadron RAF was a Royal Air Force Squadron that was a transport unit towards the end of World War II.

History

Formation in World War I
The squadron formed on 1 April 1918 as a night training unit and disbanded in 1919 without acquiring its own aircraft.

Formation in World War II
The squadron reformed on 1 February 1945 at RAF Merryfield and equipped with Halifax transport aircraft.  It then equipped with Dakotas for trooping flights to India and then destinations in Europe including Bari, Italy. The squadron disbanded in Austria on 1 November 1946 upon renumbering as No. 53 Squadron RAF.

Postwar period
The squadron reformed on 1 February 1953 when the No.2 Home Ferry Unit was numbered as 187 Squadron and it ferried aircraft in the UK and to Germany before it was finally disbanded on 2 September 1957.

Aircraft operated

References

External links

 History of No.'s 186–190 Squadrons at RAF Web
 187 Squadron history on the official RAF website

187
Military units and formations established in 1918
1918 establishments in the United Kingdom
Squadron 187